The Mongkol Borey River is a river in Mongkol Borey District in Banteay Meanchey Province in northwestern Cambodia. It flows from the border of Chanthaburi Province of Thailand and runs through Mongkol Borey and neighboring districts. It is a major tributary of the Tonlé Sap.

The Khmer Rouge destroyed a bridge which once crossed the river.

References

Rivers of Cambodia
Mongkol Borey District
Geography of Banteay Meanchey province
Tonlé Sap